Leigh Infirmary is a healthcare facility in The Avenue, Leigh, Greater Manchester, England. It is managed by the Wrightington, Wigan and Leigh NHS Foundation Trust.

History
The site for the facility was a gift from Lord Lilford of Atherton Hall. The facility itself, which was financed by a legacy from Miss Elizabeth Farnworth and by other subscribers, was completed in 1906. A ward was allocated for the treatment of military casualties at the start of the First World War. It joined the National Health Service in 1948. A new diagnostic and treatment centre was officially opened by Andy Burnham, the Shadow Health Secretary and Member of Parliament for the town, in January 2014.

References

External links
Official site

Hospitals established in 1906
1906 establishments in England
Hospitals in Greater Manchester
NHS hospitals in England
Buildings and structures in Leigh, Greater Manchester